The Second Intermediate Period dates from 1700 to 1550 B.C.E. It marks a period when ancient Egypt was broken into smaller dynasty for a second time, between the end of the Middle Kingdom and the start of the New Kingdom. The dynasties that ruled during the Second Intermediate Period were the 13th through 17th Dynasties.The concept of a "Second Intermediate Period" was a term that was starting to be used in early part of the twentieth century by Egyptologist from United Kingdom.

It is best known as the period when the Hyksos people of West Asia made their appearance in Egypt and whose reign comprised the 15th Dynasty, which, according to Manetho's Aegyptiaca, was founded by a king by the name of Salitis.

End of the Middle Kingdom 
Main articles: 12th Dynasty of Egypt

The 12th Dynasty of Egypt came to an end at the end of the 19th century BC with the death of queen Sobekneferu (1806–1802 BC). Apparently she had no heirs, causing the 12th Dynasty to come to a sudden end, and, with it, the Golden Age of the Middle Kingdom; it was succeeded by the much weaker 13th Dynasty. Retaining the seat of the 12th Dynasty, the 13th Dynasty ruled from Itjtawy ("Seizer-of-the-Two-Lands") for most of its existence, switching to Thebes in the far south possibly since the reign of Merneferre Ay.

The 13th Dynasty is notable for the accession of king Khendjer (whose name Kim Ryholt interprets as Semitic). The 13th Dynasty proved unable to hold on to the entire territory of Egypt however, and a provincial ruling family, located in the Nile Delta, broke away from the central authority to form the 14th Dynasty (contested rulers proposed by Ryholt as the first five rulers of the dynasty are commonly identified as being of Canaanite (Semitic) descent based on their names. His conclusions about their chronological position within the period are contested in Ben Tor's study. Other sources do not refer to the dynasty as foreign or Hyksos and they were not referred to as "rulers of foreign lands" or "shepherd kings" in kings lists.).

The Second Intermediate Period

13th and 14th Dynasties (Egyptian Rule)

The 13th Dynasty 
Main Article: Thirteenth Dynasty of Egypt

Retaining the seat of the 12th Dynasty, the 13th Dynasty(c. 1773 – 1650 B.C.E.). Ruled from Itjtawy ("Seizer-of-the-Two-Lands") for most of its existence, switching to Thebes in the far south possibly since the reign of Merneferre Ay. According to the Syncellus, all three sources of the king list of Africanus, Eusebius, and the Armenian of Eusebius that the 13th dynasty had sixty kings rules that lived in Dioplus for roughly 453 years. The first king was Sobekhotep I even though it was lead to believe that the first two kings were the sons of Amenemhat IV. Though the 13th Dynasty may have control Upper Egypt, the 14th Dynasty was already ruling Lower Egypt, but both houses agree to co-exist with one another with allowing trade between both. The kings of the dynasties must had trouble with contain power within their dynasty since the date we have for the kings reigns are very short and is replace rapid fashion. Along with dealing with many years of famine and serval plagues. With all factors made the 13th Dynasty weaker than the previous dynasty from the middle kingdom. Similar to the 14th dynasty, With the collapse of the 13th Dynasty lead a opening for two smaller dynasties to take control of the lands. Though it was short lived when the Hyksos came and took control of Lower Egypt.

The 14th Dynasty 
Main article: Fourteenth Dynasty of Egypt

The 14th Dynasty (c.1700-1650 B.C.E.) was also ruling in Egypt around the time of the late 13th Dynasty. While the 13th Dynasty was ruling in Thebes, the 14th Dynasty ruled in parts of Lower Egypt. According to Syncellus, all three sources agree on that the 14th Dynasty had seventy-six kings and their court was located in Xois, now modern day Sakha, though they do provide to different amount of years ruled. With the Africanus stating that the 13th Dynasty reigned for 184 years. While the Armenian version of the Eusebius stating that they reigned for 484 years. While the other Eusebius states the same as Africanus, but in another copy it states the same number as the Armenian version. Though when the 12th dDnasty collapsed, it left Upper Egypt for anyone to claim, which is why the 13th Dynasty took control of Upper Egypt. Though having two dynasty control both parts of Egypt may have lead to some conflicts, but both dynasty agree to have either own control of their own land and allow for trading between them. The 14th Dynasty saw great success during their early years, but it would turn when kings would have start using throne titles of that might gave signs of famine that was plaguing Egypt. Very similar to the 13th Dynasty with the late kings being replace ini a very rapid succession. Showing the signs that the 14th Dynasty was becoming unstable in their power over Lower Egypt. The 14th Dynasty would then be overthrown by the foreign power of the Hyksos with the 13th Dynasty falling to the Hyksos too.

15th Dynasty (Hyksos Rule)

Hyksos 
Main article: Hyksos

The Hyksos name was translated by Josephus who was looking over the conveys of Manetho's court. The name translate into two different meanings, with the first one being "Shepherd kings" and the second being as "Captive Shepherds" It is up to debate on if the movement of the Hyksos was an military invasion or mass movement of immigration of the Hyksos from somewhere of West Asia. The Hyksos established their own dynasty in Egypt, being the 15th Dynasty.

The 15th Dynasty 
Main article: Fifteenth Dynasty of Egypt

The 15th Dynasty (c.1650 to 1550 B.C.E.) of Egypt ruled from Avaris but did not control the entire land, leaving some of northern Upper Egypt under the control of both the Abydos Dynasty and the early 16th Dynasty. With the 16th Dynasty being ruled not by the Hyksos themselves, but the Thebans. The names and order of their kings is uncertain. The Turin King list indicates that there were six Hyksos kings, with an obscure Khamudi listed as the final king of the 15th Dynasty.

The 15th Dynasty would have to deal with the 16th Dynasty and would have to go into conflict with the 16th Dynasty. With the end to come when the 15th Dynasty would have overthrown the 16th Dynasty. But had to advert their attention to the north part of Egypt.  With having to focus on their own land, this allowed the 17th Dynasty to establish in place of the 16th Dynasty. There were some confrontations that happened at first between both dynasties. Both the 15th Dynasty and 17th Dynasty made some agreements to allow that allowed both to co-exist and to trade with another. The end of the 15th Dynasty saw that the later kings of both dynasties had rocky relations and might have lead a conflict between both Dynasty. Leading the final blow for the 15th Dynasty was when King Ahmose I of the 17th Dynasty Ahmosid family would continue the war against the 15th Dynasty and would be the one to expel the Hyksos from Egypt.

Abydos Dynasty 
Main Article: Abydos Dynasty

The Abydos Dynasty (c. 1640 to 1620 B.C.E.) may have been a short-lived local dynasty ruling over part of Upper Egypt during the Second Intermediate Period in Ancient Egypt and was contemporary with the 15th and 16th Dynasties. The Abydos Dynasty stay pretty small with ruling over just ruling over Abydos or Thinis. Every little is known about the Abydos Dynasty since it was very short lived dynasty. though we do have some king names that relate to the Abydos Dynasty  but the names that appear Turin king list but it doesn't appear in any other sources.The dynasty tentatively includes four rulers: Wepwawetemsaf, Pantjeny, Snaaib, and Senebkay.

The end of the Abydos Dynasty happened when the Hyksos of the 15th Dynasty started to expand to Upper Egypt and overthrew the Abydos Dynasty in the process. The 16th Dynasty would then take control of the Abydos Dynasty's land and claim as their rule.

The 16th and 17th Dynasties (Theban Rule)

The 16th dynasty 

The 16th Dynasty (c. 1650-1580 B.C.E.) ruled the Theban region in Upper Egypt. Of the two chief versions of Manetho's Aegyptiaca, Dynasty XVI is described by the more reliable Africanus (supported by Syncellus) as "shepherd [hyksos] kings", but by Eusebius as Theban. The continuing war against the 15th Dynasty dominated the short-lived 16th Dynasty. The armies of the 15th Dynasty, winning town after town from their southern enemies, continually encroached on the 16th Dynasty territory, eventually threatening and then conquering Thebes itself. Famine, which had plagued Upper Egypt during the late 13th dynasty and the 14th dynasty, also blighted the 16th Dynasty, most evidently during and after the reign of Neferhotep III.The end of the 16th Dynasty came upon by the military pressure of the 15th Dynasty. With many attempts by the 15th Dynasty with evidence of Nebiryraw I's own personal seals being found in the Hyksos territory. sometime around 1580 BCE, the 16th Dynasty would end with King Khyan of the 15th Dynasty conquering the 16th Dynasty.

17th dynasty 

The 17th dynasty (c.1571-1540 B.C.E.) would be established by the Thebans quickly after the fall of the 16th Dynasty. Though it's not known how the Thebans overthrew the Hyksos in Thebes. It could be due to the Hyksos focusing their attention to Lower Egypt but there is still debate on the topic. For the kings all three sources for Africanus, Eusebius, and the Armenian version stated that they were shepherd kings like the 15th Dynasty but also stated that they were also Thebans kings too. The 17th Dynasty would also see four different families that would be the ruling family. With the founding family last king not having a male heir to the throne. Leading to other powerful families establishing their families but having kings that would reign for a short time while on the throne.The 17th Dynasty would have peaceful relationship with the 15th Dynasty for a couple of years. Though it would end with the start of the reign of Seqenenre (c. 1549-1545 B.C.E,) that would start attacking the  15th Dynasty. King Kamose (c. 1545-1540 B.C.E.) Would continue the war against the 15th Dynasty and the Hyksos as a whole. Ahmose I would be the king to deal the final blow to the 15th Dynasty and would be the last king for the 17th Dynasty.

The End of the Second Intermediate Period 
The end of the Second Intermediate period would be when the 18th Dynasty came to power in Egypt. With the first king Ahmose actions of running out the Hyksos from Egypt power and Egypt as whole. With having removed the 15th Dynasty from power and then would consolidate the main ruling power over Egypt. By having control over the 15th and 17th Dynasty land, The 18th Dynasty was able to create a main power over Egypt. King Ahmose, he brought in new wealth for Egypt and would have start a new period called The New Kingdom of Egypt. With that new wealth and creating the strong central power in Egypt and was able to have full control over all of Egypt regions to have only one ruling power. Rather than having multiple different power groups ruling over Egypt in different regions all at the same time.

The Importance of the Second Intermediate Period 
There are very important elements when it comes to the Second Intermediate Period. One of the importance is marking the time where foreign powers is in control of Egypt. The Hyksos being one of those foreign powers that would take control over much of Egypt. The Hyksos showed that foreign powers are able to take control over Egypt. The Hyksos also had influence on the latter dynasties of the New Kingdom by having their control over Egypt expand beyond Egypt. With having the Hyksos in power being a reason why the New Kingdom dynasties would expand its territory from both the Middle Kingdom and Second Intermediate Period.

References

Bibliography
Von Beckerath, Jürgen. "Untersuchungen zur politischen Geschichte der zweiten Zwischenzeit in Ägypten,"  Ägyptologische Forschungen, Heft 23.  Glückstadt, 1965.
Gardiner, Sir Alan.  Egypt of the Pharaohs.  Oxford, 1964, 1961.
Hayes, William C.  "Egypt:  From the Death of Ammenemes III to Seqenenre II."  Chapter 2, Volume II of The Cambridge Ancient History. Revised Edition, 1965.
James, T.G.H.  "Egypt:  From the Expulsion of the Hyksos to Amenophis I."  Chapter 8, Volume II of The Cambridge Ancient History. Revised Edition, 1965.
Kitchen, Kenneth A.,  "Further Notes on New Kingdom Chronology and History,"  Chronique d'Égypte, 63 (1968), pp. 313–324.
Oren, Eliezer D. The Hyksos: New Historical and Archaeological Perspectives Philadelphia, 1997.
Ryholt, Kim. The Political Situation in Egypt during the Second Intermediate Period c. 1800–1550 B.C., Museum Tuscalanum Press, 1997. 
Van Seters, John.  The Hyksos:  A New Investigation.  New Haven, 1966.

 
States and territories established in the 17th century BC
States and territories disestablished in the 16th century BC
Dynasties of ancient Egypt
17th century BC
16th century BC
.